Barbes or Barbès or variation may refer to:

Barbes
A festival in Latvian mythology

Barbeş
Barbeş, a village in Greece merged into the town of Vergina

Barbès
People
Armand Barbès, French Republican revolutionary
Charles-Noël Barbès (1914–2008), Canadian politician and lawyer

Places
Boulevard Barbès, boulevard in the 18th arrondissement of Paris 
Barbès - Rochechouart (Paris Métro), a station on the Paris Metro
, a bar in the Park Slope neighborhood of Brooklyn, New York

Music
Barbès (album), debut solo album of Rachid Taha

See also
 Barb (disambiguation)
 Barbe (disambiguation)